Marion Johnson may refer to:

 Georgina Masson (1912–1980), born Marion Johnson, British author and photographer
 Marion Lee Johnson, African-American mathematician